Warnock Islands is a group of small offshore islands lying 1 nautical mile (1.9 km) south and southwest of Dales Island at the north end of William Scoresby Archipelago. Discovered and named in February 1936 by DI personnel on the William Scoresby.

The Islands were named after John Fleming Warnock, who was Engineer Lieutenant on the RRS William Scoresby.

References

See also 
 List of Antarctic and sub-Antarctic islands

Islands of Mac. Robertson Land